General Lord may refer to:

Dick Lord (1936–2011), South African Air Force brigadier general
Herbert Lord (1859–1930), U.S. Army brigadier general
Lance W. Lord (born 1946), U.S. Air Force four-star general
Royal B. Lord (1899–1963), U.S. Army major general
William T. Lord (born c. 1955), U.S. Air Force lieutenant general